The 1905 Trinity Blue and White baseball team represented the Trinity Blue and White baseball team of Trinity College in the 1905 college baseball season.

Bradsher missed a perfect game against Mercer due to a miscue by his shortstop in the second inning of his 22 strikeout, no-hit, no walk, ten inning performance. The game of the year was the loss to Georgia Tech.

John Heisman chose Bradsher as his premier player and captain for his All-Southern team. Barringer led the team in batting average with .253

Schedule and results

References

Trinity
Duke Blue Devils baseball seasons
Duke baseball